La Vérité si je mens ! It was followed by a sequel, in 2001, and a third movie , in 2012.

Plot 
In Paris, Eddie Vuibert (Richard Anconina) is an unemployed man in financial difficulty. A rich Jewish cloth manufacturer takes Eddie into his corporation out of pity because he mistakenly believes him to be Jewish as well. Eddie rapidly integrates in the Parisian Jewish textile community and rises as a sales manager. He continues his masquerade of pretending to be Ashkenazi Jew in order to woo his boss's daughter (played by Amira Casar).

Reception
The film was the highest-grossing French film for the year. The film was nominated for two César Awards: Casar for Most Promising Actress, and José Garcia for Most Promising Actor for his portrayal of Serge Benamou.

Sequels
A sequel, La Vérité si je mens ! 2, was released in 2001 and was even more popular in France with 7.8 million admissions, the second highest-grossing film for the year in France behind Amélie. A third film, La Vérité si je mens ! 3, followed in 2012.

References

External links

1997 films
French comedy films
Films about Jews and Judaism
Films about Moroccan Jews
1990s French films